The Seribuat bent-toed gecko (Cyrtodactylus seribuatensis) is a species of gecko that is endemic to western Malaysia.

References

Cyrtodactylus
Reptiles described in 2006